Kenneth Martin Phelan (2 November 1925 – 17 December 1987) was an Australian rules footballer who played with St Kilda in the Victorian Football League (VFL).

Phelan also served in the Royal Australian Navy during World War II.

Notes

External links 

1925 births
1987 deaths
Australian rules footballers from Melbourne
St Kilda Football Club players
People from Elsternwick, Victoria
Royal Australian Navy personnel of World War II
Military personnel from Melbourne